The following is a list of notable deaths in December 2008.

Entries for each day are listed alphabetically by surname. A typical entry lists information in the following sequence:
 Name, age, country of citizenship at birth, subsequent country of citizenship (if applicable), reason for notability, cause of death (if known), and reference.

December 2008

1
Thomas R. Adams, 87, American librarian.
Paul Benedict, 70, American television actor (The Jeffersons).
James Bree, 85, British film and television actor, illness.
Beverly Dustrude, 82, American baseball player (AAGPBL)
Betty Goodwin, 85, Canadian artist.
Jodami, 23, Irish-bred, British-trained Thoroughbred racehorse, injury.
Tom Kirby, 61, Irish darts player, pancreatic cancer.
Siegfried Knappe, 91, German Wehrmacht artillery and General Staff officer, author (Soldat).
Mikel Laboa, 74, Spanish Basque singer and songwriter.
Raymond Lederer, 70, American politician, U.S. Representative from Pennsylvania (1977–1981), lung cancer.
Lav Mantula, 79, Yugoslavian football player and coach.
Emanuel Rackman, 98, American Orthodox rabbi; President of Bar-Ilan University.
H. Sridhar, 50, Indian sound engineer, heart attack.
Dorothy Sterling, 95, American writer and historian.
Sir John Wall, 78, British jurist and blind rights campaigner.
Joseph B. Wirthlin, 91, American Mormon prelate, Apostle of The Church of Jesus Christ of Latter-day Saints, natural causes.

2
*Carlos María Abascal Carranza, 59, Mexican public official, Secretary of the Interior (2005–2006), cancer.
Kathleen Baskin-Ball, 50, American minister (United Methodist Church), cancer.
Frank Crean, 92, Australian politician, Treasurer (1972–1974), Deputy Prime Minister (1975), after short illness.
Elizabeth Warnock Fernea, 81, American writer, filmmaker and scholar, after long illness.
Leïla Karam, 80, Lebanese actress, after long illness.
Margarita Karapanou, 62, Greek author, respiratory problems.
Pyotr Latyshev, 60, Russian politician, presidential envoy to Urals Federal District.
Patrick Maitland, 17th Earl of Lauderdale, 97, British aristocrat and politician.
Henry Molaison, 82, American amnesiac, subject of brain science study, respiratory failure.
Odetta, 77, American folk singer and human rights activist, heart disease.
Edward S. Rogers Jr., 75, Canadian businessman, CEO of Rogers Communications and owner of the Toronto Blue Jays, heart failure.

3
William Pierson, Jr., 97, American art historian.
Oliver Selfridge, 82, British-born American computer scientist, pioneer of artificial intelligence, injuries from a fall.
William Spoelhof, 98, American academic, President of Calvin College (1951–1976), complications from a fall.
Ignacio Uría Mendizábal, 71, Spanish businessman, shot.
Elmer Valentine, 85, American nightclub owner.
Derek Wadsworth, 69, British composer and jazz trombonist.
Alex Widmer, 52, Swiss executive, CEO of Julius Baer bank.
Robert Zajonc, 85, Polish-born American psychologist, pancreatic cancer.

4
Forrest J. Ackerman, 92, American science fiction expert, heart failure.
Steve Bradley, 32, American wrestler.
Jan Kemp, 59, American academic, exposed bias in passing college football players, complications from Alzheimer's disease.
Warren M. Robbins, 85, American art collector, complications from a fall.
Richard Van Allan, 73, British opera singer, lung cancer.

5
A. Bernard Ackerman, 72, American dermatopathologist, heart failure.
Patriarch Alexy II of Moscow, 79, Estonian-born Russian primate of the Russian Orthodox Church since 1990, heart failure.
Jimmy Anderson, 55, American rodeo clown, heart disease.
George Brecht, 82, American artist (Fluxus), natural causes.
Martyn Crook, 52, Australian footballer and coach, heart attack.
Constantin Ticu Dumitrescu, 80, Romanian politician, cancer.
Nina Foch, 84, Dutch-born American actress (Executive Suite, Spartacus, The Ten Commandments), myelodysplasia.
Joseph Gardner, 38, American convicted murderer and fugitive, execution by lethal injection.
Beverly Garland, 82, American actress (My Three Sons), after long illness.
Paris Herouni, 75, Armenian scientist and professor.
Sir Basil Kelly, 88, British politician and jurist, after short illness.
Rawson Macharia, 96, Kenyan perjurer against Jomo Kenyatta, traffic accident.
Jean-Pierre Nguema, 76, Gabonese politician, member of the Senate of Gabon.
Anca Parghel, 51, Romanian jazz singer, metastatic breast cancer.
Richard Topus, 84, American World War II messenger pigeon trainer and business executive, kidney failure.
Dick Vertlieb, 78, American baseball and basketball executive.
Wild Again, 28, American Thoroughbred racehorse, euthanized.

6
Tamar Adar, 69, Israeli children’s author and poet.
John Cumming, 78, Scottish footballer (Hearts, Scotland).
Larry Devlin, 86, American CIA agent, emphysema.
Sir Curtis Keeble, 86, British diplomat, Ambassador to the USSR (1978–1982).
Gérard Lauzier, 76, French cartoonist and film director, after long illness.
Elliot Manyika, 53, Zimbabwean politician, road accident.
Richard Marsland, 32, Australian radio host, apparent suicide.
Lloyd Ohlin, 90, American criminologist, complications of Shy–Drager syndrome.
Ivan Semedi, 87, Ukrainian Roman Catholic prelate, bishop of Mukacheve.
Sunny von Bülow, 76, American heiress, cardiopulmonary arrest.
Peter Wardle, 77, New Zealand botanist.

7
Abul Ahsan, 71, Bangladeshi diplomat and politician, cardiac arrest.
Marky Cielo, 20, Filipino Igorot actor, suspected acute pancreatitis.
Jimmy Gourley, 82, American jazz guitarist.
Herbert Hutner, 99, American chairman of the Presidential Advisory Committee on the Arts (1982–1990).
George Kuzma, 83, American Roman Catholic prelate, bishop of the Byzantine Catholic Eparchy of Van Nuys.
Kerryn McCann, 41, Australian Olympic athlete, breast cancer.
Georges Nguyen Van Loc, 75, French police officer, writer and actor.
James H. Pomerene, 88, American electrical engineer.
Roger Sonnabend, 83, American hotelier.
John Ellis Williams, 84, British author.
Dennis Yost, 65, American singer (Classics IV), respiratory failure.
Mahbub Jamal Zahedi, 79, Pakistani journalist and philatelist, paralysis.

8
Maurice Andrieux, 83, French politician.
Manzoor Hussain Atif, 81, Pakistani field hockey player and administrator, after long illness.
Frank K. Edmondson, 96, American astronomer.
Xavier Perrot, 76, Swiss auto racer.
Oliver Postgate, 83, British animator (Bagpuss, Clangers).
Robert Prosky, 77, American actor (The Natural, Broadcast News, Hill Street Blues), complications from a heart procedure.
Bob Spiers, 63, British television director (Absolutely Fabulous, Fawlty Towers), after long illness.
William S. Stevens, 60, American lawyer, heart attack.
Hillary Waugh, 88, American mystery writer.

9
Jonathan Bailey, 69, British Angelican prelate, Bishop of Derby (1995–2005) and Clerk of the Closet (1997–2005).
Emmanuel Bitanga, 55, Cameroonian Olympic sprinter.
Ibrahim Dossey, 36, Ghanaian footballer, car accident.
James Fergason, 74, American inventor.
Yuri Glazkov, 69, Russian cosmonaut.
Dražan Jerković, 72, Croatian football player and manager, heart failure.
José María Larrauri Lafuente, 90, Spanish Roman Catholic prelate, bishop of Vitoria.
Howard Pack, 90, American businessman, shipping magnate, heart failure.
William Neff Patman, 81, American politician, U.S. Representative for Texas (1981–1985), cancer.
Pentti Rummakko, 65, Finnish Olympic runner.
George Turman, 80, American politician, Lieutenant Governor of Montana (1981–1989), natural causes.

10
Henning Christiansen, 76, Danish composer.
Mildred Constantine, 95, American curator (Museum of Modern Art), heart failure.
Chaudhary Munawwar Hasan, 44, Indian politician, car accident.
Dorothy Porter, 54, Australian poet (The Monkey's Mask), breast cancer.
Didith Reyes, 60, Filipino singer, heart attack and rupture of the pancreas.
Chris Richardson, 28, American basketball player (Harlem Globetrotters), brain aneurysm.
Owen Wade, 87, British medical researcher and physician.
Mizuki Yamada, 80, Japanese Olympic sailor Olympedia – Mizuki Yamada
Sal Yvars, 84, American baseball player (New York Giants), amyloidosis.

11
Ali Alatas, 76, Indonesian politician, Foreign Minister (1988–1999), heart attack.
Maddie Blaustein, 48, American voice actress (Pokémon, Yu-Gi-Oh!, Chaotic), stomach virus.
Ron Carey, 72, American labor leader (Teamsters), lung cancer.
Robert Chandler, 80, American CBS executive, heart failure.
Elie Amsini Kiswaya, 80, Congolese Roman Catholic prelate, bishop of Sakania-Kipushi.
Angeliki Laiou, 67, Greek historian, anaplastic thyroid cancer.
Bettie Page, 85, American pin-up model and actress, complications from a heart attack.
Robert Shepherd, 71, American academic lawyer.
Yeh Shih-tao, 83, Taiwanese writer, colorectal cancer.

12
David Charteris, 12th Earl of Wemyss, 96, British aristocrat and public servant.
Paddy Dooley, 82, Irish Olympic rower.
Avery Dulles, 90, American Roman Catholic Jesuit priest, theologian and cardinal.
Max Elbin, 88, American golfer, president of the PGA (1965−1968), heart failure.
Daniel Carleton Gajdusek, 85, American virologist, recipient of the Nobel Prize for Physiology or Medicine (1976).
Sigitas Geda, 65, Lithuanian poet.
Van Johnson, 92, American actor (Battleground, The Caine Mutiny, Brigadoon, Batman), natural causes.
Emmanuel Kasonde, 72, Zambian economist and politician, Finance Minister (1967−1971).
Tassos Papadopoulos, 74, Cypriot politician, President (2003−2008), small cell lung carcinoma.
Maksym Pashayev, 20, Ukrainian footballer, car accident.
Amalia Solórzano, 97, Mexican First Lady (1934–1940), respiratory complications.
Robin Toner, 54, American journalist (The New York Times), colon cancer.

13
Doris Totten Chase, 85, American painter and sculptor.
Christmas Past, 29, American Thoroughbred racehorse, infirmities of old age.
Sir David Clutterbuck, 95, British admiral.
John Drake, 49, New Zealand rugby union player.
Mario Álvarez Dugan, 77, Dominican journalist and newspaper editor, heart problems.
Otto Felix, 65, American actor, amyloidosis.
Vince Karalius, 76, British rugby league player, cancer.
Shan Lloyd, 55, British journalist, wife of actor Hugh Lloyd.
David Margolis, 78, American industrialist, cardiac arrest.
Maurice Meersman, 86, Belgian cyclist.
Kjartan Slettemark, 76, Norwegian political artist, heart failure.
Kathy Staff, 80, British actress (Last of the Summer Wine), brain tumour.
Horst Tappert, 85, German actor (Derrick).

14
Véronique Ahoyo, 69, Beninese politician, car accident.
K. P. Appan, 72, Indian literary critic.
Mike Bell, 37, American professional wrestler (WWF, ECW), heart attack.
Hank Goldup, 90, Canadian ice hockey player.
Henri G. Hers, 85, Belgian biochemist.
William Kaufmann, 90, American nuclear strategist, adviser to seven Defense Secretaries, Alzheimer's disease.
Carl Kotchian, 94, American aviation executive, president of Lockheed.
Gastón Parra Luzardo, 75, Venezuelan academic and banker, after long illness.
Candida Tobin, 82, British music educator.
Nick Willhite, 67, American baseball pitcher, cancer.

15
Hassib Ben Ammar, 84, Tunisian politician and journalist/editor.
Valentin Berlinsky, 83, Russian cellist, after long illness.
Mike Blum, 65, Canadian football player (Toronto Argonauts, Hamilton Tiger-Cats), cerebral hemorrhage.
Carlo Caracciolo, 83, Italian publisher (La Repubblica).
León Febres Cordero, 77, Ecuadorian president (1984–1988), complications from pulmonary emphysema.
Davey Graham, 68, British guitarist, lung cancer.
Wanda Koczeska, 71, Polish actress.
David Lieber, 83, Polish-born American biblical scholar, lung ailment.
John W. Powell, 89, Chinese-born American journalist tried for sedition, complications from pneumonia.
Gian Franco Romagnoli, 82, Italian chef, author, television personality.
Clyde Sproat, 78, American musician.
Anne-Cath. Vestly, 88, Norwegian children's writer and actress.
John Webster, 95, Australian activist.
Jay E. Welch, 83, American musician, founder of the Mormon Youth Symphony and Chorus.

16
Claudio Apollonio, 87, Italian ice hockey player.
Peg Batty, 88, New Zealand cricketer.
Evelyn Bonaci, 92, Maltese politician, MP.
Sam Bottoms, 53, American actor (Apocalypse Now, The Last Picture Show, The Outlaw Josey Wales), glioblastoma multiforme.
Richard Coleman, 78, British actor.
George Constantinou, 75, Cypriot-born Papua New Guinean businessman, aggravated assault during carjacking.
Serigne Lamine Diop, 74, Senegalese statistician and politician.
Julius Fast, 89, American writer.
Harold Gramatges, 90, Cuban composer and pianist.
Joe Krol, 89, Canadian football player (Toronto Argonauts).
Norberto Raffo, 69, Argentinian football player and manager (Banfield).
John E. Sprizzo, 73, American jurist, organ failure.
Zlatko Šugman, 76, Slovenian actor, illness.

17
Elizabeth Abrahams, 83, South African political activist and trade unionist.
Turgun Alimatov, 85, Uzbek musician.
Ismet Bajramović, 42, Bosnian reputed organized crime figure and wartime commander, suicide by gunshot.
Sammy Baugh, 94, American football player (Washington Redskins) and member of the Pro Football Hall of Fame.
Freddy Breck, 66, German schlager singer, cancer.
Ved Prakash Goyal, 82, Indian politician, brain tumor.
Gregoire, 66, Congolese African-born primate, oldest known chimpanzee.
Ai Iijima, 36, Japanese media personality and AIDS activist, former adult film actress, pneumonia.
Justin Levens, 28, American mixed martial art fighter, possible suicide by gunshot.
Luis Félix López, 76, Ecuadorian writer and politician, Secretary of Government, cancer.
Willoughby Sharp, 72, American artist, art dealer, curator and impresario, throat cancer.
Dave Smith, 53, American baseball pitcher (Houston Astros), heart attack.
Feliciano Vierra Tavares, 88, American musician and singer, father of the Tavares Brothers, prostate cancer.
Henry Ashby Turner, 76, American historian, melanoma.
Nina Varlamova, 54, Russian politician, mayor of Kandalaksha, stabbed.

18
Majel Barrett, 76, American actress (Star Trek), leukemia.
Peter Malam Brothers, 91, British Royal Air Force pilot, Battle of Britain ace.
Pete Case, 67, American football player (New York Giants), after long illness.
John Costelloe, 47, American actor (The Sopranos, Kazaam, Die Hard 2), suicide by gunshot.
Jack Douglas, 81, British comedy actor (Carry On films), pneumonia.
Mark Felt, 95, American public official, Deputy Director of the FBI, "Deep Throat" in the Watergate scandal, heart failure.
Hannah Frank, 100, British sculptor.
*Nahla Hussain al-Shaly, 37, Iraqi women's rights activist, shot and decapitated.
Robert Jonquet, 83, French footballer, after long illness.
Ian MacMillan, 67, American author.
Conor Cruise O'Brien, 91, Irish politician, writer and academic.
Ivan Rabuzin, 87, Croatian painter.
Harold Snyder, 86, American pharmaceuticals magnate, pioneer of generic drugs, respiratory failure.
Paul Weyrich, 66, American conservative activist, co-founder of the Heritage Foundation think tank, diabetes.

19
James Bevel, 72, American civil rights leader, pancreatic cancer.
Page Cavanaugh, 86, American jazz pianist and singer, kidney failure.
Carol Chomsky, 78, American linguist, wife of Noam Chomsky, cancer.
Michael Connell, 45, American political strategist, plane crash.
Kenny Cox, 68, American jazz musician, lung cancer.
Sir Bernard Crick, 79, British political theorist, cancer.
Dock Ellis, 63, American baseball player (Pittsburgh Pirates), cirrhosis.
Vi Hilbert, 90, American tribal leader.
Neal Kenyon, 79, American theater director.
Joe L. Kincheloe, 58, American professor, heart attack.
Matt Kofler, 49, American football player (Buffalo Bills, Indianapolis Colts).
Derek Stanford, 90, British poet and critic.
Sam Tingle, 87, Zimbabwean racing driver.

20
Samuele Bacchiocchi, 70, Italian theologian, liver cancer.
Joseph Conombo, 91, Burkinabé politician, Prime Minister of Upper Volta (1978–1980).
Jack Kuehler, 76, American electrical engineer, president of I.B.M. (1989–1993), Parkinson's disease.
Gabriel Larraín Valdivieso, 83, Chilean Roman Catholic prelate, bishop of the diocese of Santiago de Chile.
Olga Lepeshinskaya, 92, Ukrainian-born Russian ballerina.
Joel Mandelstam, 89, British biochemist and microbiologist.
Adrian Mitchell, 76, British poet, heart attack.
Robert Mulligan, 83, American film director (To Kill a Mockingbird), heart disease.
Albin Planinc, 64, Slovenian chess grandmaster, after long illness.
Dorothy Sarnoff, 94, American opera singer, actress and self-help consultant.
Igor Troubetzkoy, 96, Russian auto racer.

21
Chayben Abou-Nehra, 34, Belizean businessman, suicide.
Lady Anne Cavendish-Bentinck, 92, British noble.
James Fulton, 58, Canadian politician, MP for Skeena (1979–1993), colon cancer.
Teddy Gueritz, 89, British Royal Navy admiral.
Christopher Hibbert, 84, British historian.
Ron Hornaday, Sr., 77, American NASCAR driver, cancer.
Al Meyerhoff, 61, American lawyer, complications from leukemia.
Carlos Manuel Santiago, 82, Puerto Rican baseball player (Negro leagues), heart failure.
Dale Wasserman, 94, American playwright (Man of La Mancha), heart failure.
Maurice Zilber, 88, Egyptian horse trainer, cancer.

22
Yoshiro Asakuma, 94, Japanese Olympic athlete.
Anand Babla, 54, Fijian politician, MP (1992–2006), after long illness.
Coy Bacon, 66, American football player (Los Angeles Rams, Cincinnati Bengals, Washington Redskins).
Lansana Conté, 74, Guinean politician, President of Guinea since 1984, after long illness.
Norm Cook, 53, American basketball player (Kansas Jayhawks, Boston Celtics).
Ossie Dawson, 89, South African cricketer.
Jani Lehtonen, 40, Finnish pole vaulter.
Robert J. Marshall, 90, American minister, president of the Lutheran Church in America (1968–1978), heart failure.
Hugh Myers, 78, American chess player and author.
Erkki Puolakka, 83, Finnish Olympic runner.
Alfred Shaheen, 86, American textile manufacturer, popularized the Hawaiian shirt, complications of diabetes.
Guy Warren, 85, Ghanaian jazz musician, illness.

23
Clint Ballard, Jr., 77, American songwriter ("You're No Good").
Manuel Benitez, 39, American child actor and FBI fugitive, shot.
Narciso Bernardo, 71, Filipino basketball player, cardiac arrest.
Thomas Congdon, 77, American editor, Parkinson's disease and heart failure.
Frank Krog, 54, Norwegian actor.
Mitsugu Saotome, 82, Japanese author.
Héctor Thomas, 70, Venezuelan Olympic decathlete, cancer.
Ron Unsworth, 85, British Olympic hurdler.
Thierry de la Villehuchet, 65, French money manager and businessman, apparent suicide.
Eric Charles Twelves Wilson, 96, British recipient of the Victoria Cross.
Arnold Jacob Wolf, 84, American rabbi, heart attack.

24
Ian Ballinger, 83, New Zealand sport shooter, 1968 Olympic medallist.
Ray Deakin, 49, British footballer (Bolton Wanderers, Burnley), brain cancer.
Stanley Eveling, 83, British playwright.
Gordon Fairweather, 85, Canadian politician, MP for Royal, New Brunswick (1962–1977).
Ralph Harris, 87, British journalist, respiratory failure.
Samuel P. Huntington, 81, American political scientist, heart failure and complications of diabetes.
Harold Pinter, 78, British playwright (The Homecoming), recipient of the Nobel Prize for Literature (2005), throat cancer.
Rik Renders, 86, Belgian cyclist.
Alf Robertson, 67, Swedish singer and composer.
Ruhlmann, 23, American Thoroughbred racehorse, aneurism.

25
Edd Cartier, 94, American illustrator (The Shadow).
Alvah Chapman, Jr., 87, American publisher and philanthropist, pneumonia.
Justin Eilers, 30, American mixed martial artist, shot.
Olívio Aurélio Fazza, 83, Brazilian Roman Catholic prelate, bishop of the Diocese of Foz do Iguaçu.
Leo Frankowski, 65, American science fiction author.
William Glendon, 89, American attorney.
Lars Hollmer, 60, Swedish musician.
Eartha Kitt, 81, American singer and actress (Batman, The Emperor's New Groove, Holes), colon cancer.
Ann Savage, 87, American actress (Detour), complications from stroke.
Robert Ward, 70, American blues singer and guitarist.
Colin White, 57, British naval historian, cancer.

26
Jaroslav Fikejz, 81, Czech Olympic athlete.
Israel Horowitz, 92, American record producer.
Eberhard Kneisl, 92, Austrian Olympic alpine skier.
Gösta Krantz, 83, Swedish actor.
Mikhail Krichevsky, 111, Ukrainian supercentenarian.
Alan W. Lear, 55, Scottish writer.
George Miller, 69, British footballer and manager (Falkirk FC, Wolverhampton Wanderers), cancer.
Sir Kenneth Stoddart, 94, British Lord Lieutenant of Merseyside (1979–1989).
Dick Voris, 86, American football player and coach.
J. Lamar Worzel, 89, American oceanographer, heart attack.
Wyvetter H. Younge, 78, American politician, member of the Illinois House of Representatives since 1975, surgical complications.

27
Arild Andresen, 80, Norwegian footballer and ice hockey player (Vålerenga).
Rodrigo Arango Velásquez, 83, Colombian Roman Catholic prelate, Bishop of the Diocese of Buga.
Delaney Bramlett, 69, American songwriter and record producer, complications from gallbladder surgery.
Sailor Brown, 93, British footballer and manager.
Roque Cordero, 91, Panamanian-born American composer.
John Fenton, 87, British Anglican priest and New Testament scholar.
Robert Graham, 70, Mexican-born American sculptor, husband of actress Anjelica Huston, after long illness.
Ian Harland, 76, British Anglican prelate, Bishop of Carlisle (1989–2000), after long illness.
Michael Hicks, 80, British army general.
Ja'afar of Negeri Sembilan, 86, Malaysian King (1994–1999), Great Ruler of Negeri Sembilan since 1967.
Patricia Kneale, 83, British actress.
Iain MacLean, 55, Australian politician, Western Australian MLC for North Metropolitan (1994–1996) and MLA for Wanneroo (1996–2001).
Christine Maggiore, 51, American AIDS denialist, pneumonia.
Sahu Mewalal, 82, Indian footballer, natural causes.
Alfred Pfaff, 82, German footballer, 1954 FIFA World Cup winner.

28
Quentin C. Aanenson, 87, American fighter pilot, cancer.
A. O. L. Atkin, 83, American mathematician, complications from a fall.
Willie Clark, 90, Scottish footballer (Hibernian, St Johnstone).
Vincent Ford, 68, Jamaican reggae songwriter ("No Woman, No Cry"), complications from diabetes.
Donald Gleason, 88, American physician, creator of prostate cancer test, heart attack.
Sir Michael Levey, 81, British art historian, Director of the National Gallery (1973–1986).
Oliver Lincoln Lundquist, 92, American architect and industrial designer, created the United Nations logo, prostate cancer.
Haralamb Zincă, 85, Romanian writer, Alzheimer's disease.

29
Manjit Bawa, 67, Indian painter, after long illness.
William Ellis Green, 85, Australian cartoonist.
Jim Horne, 91, American model, heart failure.
Freddie Hubbard, 70, American jazz trumpeter, complications from a heart attack.
Victor H. Krulak, 95, American Marine Corps officer.
Vladislav Lalicki, 73, Serbian production designer. 
Ted Lapidus, 79, French fashion designer, respiratory failure.
Daniel Nagrin, 91, American choreographer and dancer.
Alan Sargeson, 78, Australian chemist.
Harlington Wood Jr., 88, American lawyer.
Yang Jinzong, 76, Chinese chemical engineer.

30
Roy Boehm, 84, American Navy SEAL commander.
Stewart Cleveland Cureton, 78, American pastor, President of the National Baptist Convention (1999).
Richard Genelle, 47, American actor (Mighty Morphin Power Rangers, Power Rangers: Zeo), heart attack.
Bernie Hamilton, 80, American actor (Starsky and Hutch), cardiac arrest.
Paul Hofmann, 96, Austrian writer, informant against the Nazis.
Peter Karmel, 86, Australian economist.
Roy Saari, 63, American swimmer, Olympic gold medalist (1964).

31
Stan Kielty, 83, English rugby league player (Halifax, national team).
Premjit Lall, 68, Indian tennis player, after long illness.
Kazbek Pagiyev, 49, Russian politician, mayor of Vladikavkaz, shot.
Brad Sullivan, 77, American actor (Slap Shot, The Prince of Tides, The Sting), liver cancer.
Vic Washington, 62, American football player (San Francisco 49ers).
Donald E. Westlake, 75, American mystery writer, heart attack.

References

2008-12
12